Viktor Nilsson (born 14 July 1993), sometimes spelled Victor Nilsson, is a Swedish footballer who plays as a forward.

References

External links

1993 births
Living people
Association football forwards
Swedish footballers
Allsvenskan players
Superettan players
IFK Värnamo players
Mjällby AIF players
Jönköpings Södra IF players
Trelleborgs FF players